The year 1885 in archaeology involved some significant events.

Events
 The British School at Athens is established.

Explorations
 Explorations continue in many places, from Latin America to Italy to Japan.

Excavations
 At Ostia Antica (near Rome), the Quattro Tempietti (Four Small Temples) are excavated in 1885-1886 by R. Lanciani (The square in front is excavated in 1911-1915 by D. Vaglieri and R. Paribeni).
 On the outskirts of Rome, Italy, the ruins of the Temple of Diana at Nemi are excavated by British Ambassador Lord John Savile of Rufford Abbey.
 In Wales, at Ffynnon Beuno Cave, Tremeirchion, Denbighshire, the cave complex is excavated: occupational evidence includes Aurignacian and proto-Solutrean flint work plus Pleistocene fauna (Palaeolithic, Old Stone Age).
 In Japan, the Katsutachi Pit is excavated in 1885 (Meiji 18) under the leadership of Takuma Dan, an American-trained engineer.
 At Susa, Marcel-Auguste Dieulafoy and Jane Dieulafoy begin French excavations.

Publications
 Désiré Charnay's account of his explorations in Mesoamerica, Les Anciennes Villes du Nouveau Monde, published in Paris.
 William Collings Lukis -
 Prehistoric Stone Monuments of the British Isles: Cornwall with 40 tinted litho plates, accurately drawn to scale by W. C. Lukis and W. C. Borlase, published by the Society of Antiquaries.
 "Report of survey of certain megalithic monuments in Scotland, Cumberland and Westmoreland, executed in summer 1884". Proceedings of the Society of Antiquaries pp. 302–11.
 American Journal of Archaeology first published.

Births
 September 13: John Beazley, British Classical archaeologist (d. 1970)
 October 29: Alfred V. Kidder, American archaeologist (d. 1963)

Deaths

References

Archaeology
Archaeology by year
Archaeology
Archaeology